Chat or chats may refer to:

Communication
 Conversation, particularly casual 
 Online chat, text message communication over the Internet in real-time
 Synchronous conferencing, a formal term for online chat
 SMS chat, a form of text messaging
 A popular term for internet relay chat
 Chat room or group chat
 Video chat
 Text messaging, person-to-person chat, i.e. non group chat

Entertainment
 Chat (magazine), a British weekly women's magazine
 CHAT-FM, a radio station (94.5 FM) licensed to Medicine Hat, Alberta, Canada
 CHAT-TV, a television station (channel 6) licensed to Medicine Hat, Alberta, Canada
 Le Chat, a Belgian comic strip
 Sophia "Chat" Sanduval, a Marvel Comics character
 Chat Chat, a 1995 album by Takako Minekawa
 Chat show, a radio and television format

Places
Chat, Iran, a village in Iran
Chat, Kyrgyzstan, a village in Kyrgyzstan
Chat, Turkmenistan, a Russian fort at the mouth of the Sumbar River in 1879
Chat, California, an alternate name of Chats, USA
CHAT (Centre for Heritage, Arts and Textile)

Science and medicine
Checklist for Autism in Toddlers, used in autism screening
Choline acetyltransferase, an enzyme that synthesises acetylcholine
(Z)-3-hexen-1-ol acetyltransferase, an enzyme

Birds
Chat (bird), Old World flycatchers of subfamily Saxicolinae, which resemble small thrushes, as well as:
Australian chats, songbirds of genera Ashbyia and Epthianura (family Meliphagidae)
American chats, songbirds of genus Granatellus (family Cardinalidae)
Yellow-breasted chat (Icteria virens), an enigmatic North American songbird of unresolved affiliations

Other uses
Chat (mining), the waste rocks produced in mining
Chat (ppp), an automated conversational script with a modem
The Chats, an Australian garage punk band
Community Hebrew Academy of Toronto, a Jewish secondary school in Toronto
Choosing Healthplans All Together, a health insurance choosing exercise
Cultural-historical activity theory, in social psychology
Chāt or Chaat, Indian and Pakistani savoury snacks
Chats, potatoes considered too small and/or blemished for human use but suitable for fodder use
Codes for the Human Analysis of Transcripts, a format used by the CHILDES project

See also
Chat room (disambiguation)
Chatbot (disambiguation)

Khat, a plant with stimulant properties in humans
Chatroulette, service for random chat all around the world